Charles Gagnier (born July 19, 1985 in Victoriaville, Quebec) is a Canadian freeskier, best known for inventing the Octograb in 2006.

Career 
Gagnier began skiing with his family at Canada's Mont-Sainte-Anne resort. He started his competitive career as an alpine ski racer in Quebec, Canada before switching to freestyle skiing. He credits his brother Antoine for pushing him towards freeskiing, introducing him to twin tips at age 15.
Gagnier's first major competitive freestyle skiing win was in the U.S. Freeskiing Open Big Air Invitational at Copper Mountain in Frisco, Colorado. He won Gold in Men's Ski Slopestyle at the 2005 Winter X Games IX in Aspen, Colorado. At the 2006 Winter X Games X, he placed second in the Men's Ski Big Air event to T.J. Schiller, and at the 2008 Winter X Games XII, he again placed second in the Men's Ski Big Air event to Jon Olsson. In 2012 and 2013, he won the Slopestyle ski event at Red Bull Playstreets.

Personal life 
Gagnier has two brothers, Antoine and Vincent.

References

1985 births
Living people
Canadian male freestyle skiers
X Games athletes
Canadian freeskiers
People from Victoriaville
Sportspeople from Quebec